Radęca (or Rdęca) is a river in western Poland, a tributary of the Orla.  It meets the Orla at Jutrosin, where it is dammed to create Zbiornik Justrosin (Lake Justrosin) just north of the town and above the confluence.

Rivers of Poland
Rivers of Greater Poland Voivodeship